The Trafalgar Square Christmas tree is a Christmas tree given to the people of London by the city of Oslo each year since 1947. The tree is prominently displayed in Trafalgar Square from the beginning of December until 6 January.

History

A Trafalgar Square Christmas tree has been an annual gift to the people of Britain from Norway as a token of gratitude for British support to Norway during the Second World War since 1942, when the first tree was cut down by a Norwegian resistance fighter called Mons Urangsvåg during a raid on Hisøy, an island off the west coast of Norway between Bergen and Haugesund. The tree was then transported to England, where the Norwegian king, Haakon VII, was in exile, and given to him. A new tree has since grown from the original stump.

The tree has provided a central focus for the Trafalgar Square traditional carol-singing programme, performed by different groups raising money for voluntary or charitable organisations.

The tree remains until just before the Twelfth Night of Christmas, when it is taken down for recycling. The tree is chipped and composted, to make mulch.

Tree
The Trafalgar Square Christmas tree is typically a 50- to 60-year-old Norway spruce, generally over 20 metres tall. The tree is cut in Norway some time in November during a ceremony attended by the British Ambassador to Norway, Mayor of Oslo, and Lord Mayor of Westminster. After the tree is cut, it is shipped to the UK by boat across the sea. At one time  it was shipped to Felixstowe free of charge by a cargo ship of the Fred Olsen Line. As of at least 2007, the tree was shipped across the North Sea to Immingham by DFDS Tor Line. As of 2018, it has been the responsibility of Radius Group, to transport, guard and erect the tree in Trafalgar Square.

The Trafalgar Square tree is decorated in a traditional Norwegian style and adorned with 500 white lights. In 2008, the tree utilised low-wattage halogen bulbs which used 3.5 kW of power.

At the base of the tree stands a plaque, bearing the words:
This tree is given by the city of Oslo as a token of Norwegian gratitude to the people of London for their assistance during the years 1940-45.A tree has been given annually since 1947.

Lighting ceremony and carolling

The tree lighting ceremony in Trafalgar Square takes place on the first Thursday in December and is attended by thousands of people. The ceremony, led by the Lord Mayor of Westminster, includes a band and choir followed by the switching on of the Christmas lights.

Traditionally, the tree provides a focal point for Christmas carolling groups. For many in London, the tree and the accompanying carolling signals the countdown to Christmas.

Since 2009, the Poetry Society has commissioned new poems annually for display on banners around the base of the tree. In 2010, schoolchildren also performed one of the poems at the lighting-up ceremony.

References

External links

 LONDON.GOV.UK - Christmas in Trafalgar Square
 Trafalgar Square Christmas Tree on Twitter

1947 establishments in England
1947 introductions
Aftermath of World War II in the United Kingdom
Christmas in England
Christmas in the United Kingdom
Diplomatic gifts
Flora of Norway
Individual Christmas trees
Individual trees in England
Norway–United Kingdom relations
Christmas tree